Armando Junior Quitirna (born 25 April 2000) is a Bissau-Guinean professional footballer who plays for Fleetwood Town.

Career

Charlton Athletic
Quitirna made two appearances for Charlton Athletic, both in cup games before it was announced on 18 May 2021 that he would leave the club at the end of his contract.

Waterford
It was announced that had Quitirna made the move to League of Ireland Premier Division side Waterford on 9 July 2021. On the same day, he made his debut for the club, scoring a penalty in a 1–0 win away to Finn Harps. On 30 July 2021, he came off the bench away to Drogheda United in the 75th minute and scored the winning goal eight minutes later in a 2–1 win for his side. He made a total of 20 appearances in all competitions over the season, scoring seven goals as the club were relegated to the League of Ireland First Division.

Fleetwood Town
On 31 January 2023, Quitirna joined League One club Fleetwood Town, immediately being loaned out to National League club Altrincham on an initial one-month deal. Quitirna returned to his parent club on 2 March 2023, after making just 1 appearance for Altrincham, playing 10 minutes in an FA Trophy tie away to Bracknell Town, in which he scored the last goal in a 3–1 win.

Career statistics

References

2000 births
Living people
Bissau-Guinean footballers
Association football midfielders
Charlton Athletic F.C. players
Waterford F.C. players
Fleetwood Town F.C. players
Altrincham F.C. players
League of Ireland players
Bissau-Guinean expatriate footballers
Expatriate association footballers in the Republic of Ireland